Rev. James Karnusian (1926 in Beirut, Lebanon – April 8, 1998 in Bern, Switzerland) was a Swiss-Armenian pastor, writer and public activist.

Biography
A son of Armenian genocide survivors from Musa Ler, Karnusian was born in 1926 in a camp of refugees in Beirut. He studied at the universities of Greece and Switzerland. In 1979 he initiated the first Armenian World Congress in Paris. In 1983 on the occasion of the 60th centenary of the Treaty of Lausanne, James Karnusian organized a Pan-Armenian convention in Lausanne attended by delegates from 17 countries. "Our priority remains the recovery of Western Armenia occupied by Turkey," he explained.

In 1992 he co-founded the Switzerland-Armenia Association (GSA - Gesellschaft Schweiz-Armenien) together with Hans Schellenberg, civil servant in the Federal Department of Foreign Affairs, and former deputy of National Council of Switzerland Alexander Euler.

He was allegedly one of the founders of Armenian Secret Army for the Liberation of Armenia militant organization, alongside Hagop Hagopian (real name Harutiun Tagushian) and Kevork Ajemian, a literary figure and publisher of the literary publication Spurk.

Books
Back to the Ararat Highlands, printed in Switzerland, 1976 (original title: Վերադարձ Դէպի Այրարատեան Լեռնաշխարհ).
Return to the Ararat Plateau: Pan-Armenian Liberation Movement, by James Karnusian, translated by Aris Sevag, AR Publishing, 1979, 43 pages

References

External links
 Website of Switzerland-Armenia Association

1926 births
1998 deaths
Armenian Secret Army for the Liberation of Armenia
Lebanese emigrants to Switzerland
Lebanese people of Armenian descent
Swiss clergy
Swiss male writers
Swiss people of Armenian descent
Swiss writers
Writers from Beirut